Theodora Komnene (died 2 January 1184), Latinized Theodora Comnena, was a daughter of the Byzantine prince Andronikos Komnenos and his wife, Eirene (?Aineiadissa). Based on the writings of Niketas Choniates, it is likely Theodora was Andronikos' second daughter. The year of Theodora's birth is unknown.

Life and Death
Little is known of Theodora's early life, except that her father died in 1142. She does not appear in the historical record again until the late 1140s, when she was betrothed to and married Henry II of Austria, whose first wife, Gertrude of Supplingenburg had died in 1143. The marriage had been arranged by her uncle, Manuel I and her eventual husband's half-brother, Conrad III of Germany, during the latter's stay in Constantinople.

Theodora and Henry were married in Constantinople, and subsequently granted the Duchy of Austria by Frederick I Barbarossa in 1156.

Theodora died on 2 January 1184.

Family
Theodora had three children by her husband Henry:
Agnès (?1154 – 13 January 1182) married to Stephen III of Hungary
Leopold V, Duke of Austria (1157 – 31 December 1194)
Henry, Duke of Mödling (1158 – 31 August 1223) married Richeza of Bohemia, daughter of Vladislaus II, Duke of Bohemia.

Ancestry

References

Sources
 
 Runciman, S.; A History of the Crusades, Vols. 1-3 (Penguin Books, 1978)
 Fuhrmann, H., (trans. Reuter, T.); Germany in the high middle ages c.1050-1200 (Cambridge University Press, 1995)
 Pertz, G. H. (ed.); Auctarium Zwetlensis et Continuatio (Hannover, 1851, 1925)
 Hereberg-Fränke, S. (ed.); Diocesis Salisburgensis Regiones Salisburgensis et Bavarica (Berlin, 1904)
 Johannes Preiser-Kapeller, Von Ostarrichi an den Bosporus. Ein Überblick zu den Beziehungen im Mittelalter (From Ostarrichi to the Bosporus: an overview of relations in the Middle Ages), in: Pro Oriente Jahrbuch 2010. Vienna 2011, p. 66-77

Theodora
1184 deaths
12th-century Byzantine people
Austrian royal consorts
Year of birth unknown